Proto-Yeniseian is the reconstruction of the language from which all Yeniseian languages are descended from. It is uncertain whether Proto-Yeniseian had a similar tone/pitch accent system as Ket. Many studies about Proto-Yeniseian phonology have been done, however there are still many things unclear about Proto-Yeniseian. The probable location of the Yeniseian homeland is proposed on the basis of geographic names and genetic studies, which suggests a homeland in Southern Siberia.

Reconstructions 
Proto-Yeniseian had an adjective suffix *-se. Proto-Yeniseian also had possessive prefixes. Proto-Yeniseian probably had labialized velars.

Some lexical reconstructions are:

 Alive *ʔeʔte
 Back *suga
 Be *hʌs
 Big *χeʔ
 Break *kup
 Brother *bis
 Deep *poqe
 Clean *-pʌx
 Cow *tiχa
 Saliva *duk
 Field *kʌb-
 Flour *talkʌn
 Stallion *ʔɨʔχ-kuʔs

References

External links 
Proto-Yeniseian reconstructions at Wiktionary

Yeniseian languages